Jean-Louis-Ignace de La Serre, sieur de Langlade, was an 18th-century French novelist and playwright born in Cahors in 1662 and died 30 September 1756.

Royal censor, he authored a biography of Molière. He was wrongly attributed some works by Marguerite de Lussan.

Works

Librettos 
1706: Polyxène et Pirrhus by Pascal Collasse
1710: Diomède by Toussaint Bertin de la Doué
1723: Pirithoüs by Jean-Joseph Mouret
1726: Pirame et Thisbé by François Francoeur and François Rebel
1735: Scanderberg by François Francoeur and François Rebel
1741: Nitétis by Charles-Louis Mion

Other 
1727: Hippalque, prince scythe
1728: Amosis, prince égyptien
1734: Mémoire sur la vie et les ouvrages de Molière, in Œuvres de Molière, in-4°, tome VII

Bibliography 
 Cardinal Georges Grente (dir.), Dictionnaire des lettres françaises. Le XVIIIe siècle, nlle. édition revue et mise à jour sous la direction de François Moureau, Paris, Fayard, 1995.

External links 
 His plays and their presentations on CÉSAR
 Jean-Louis-Ignace de La Serre on data.bnf.fr

1662 births
People from Cahors
1756 deaths
18th-century French writers
18th-century French male writers
18th-century French dramatists and playwrights
French opera librettists